Thomas Cobb is an American director, editor, compositor, and cinematographer who directed the opening credit sequence for "Orange Is the New Black".

External links
 Website

References

American cinematographers
American directors
Year of birth missing (living people)
Living people